El Dorado Park South is a neighborhood located on the east side of Long Beach. It is a residential neighborhood close to the El Dorado Regional Park and the 605 and 405 Freeways. The neighborhood of El Dorado Park South is very close to the Seal Beach City line and is on the Orange and Los Angeles County Line

Location
El Dorado Park South is bounded by El Dorado Regional Park on the north, Studebaker Road on the west, Atherton on the South and a flood control channel in the east.

See also
Neighborhoods of Long Beach, California

External links

El Dorado Regional Park Map
CSU Long Beach

Neighborhoods in Long Beach, California